Kronberg Park is a public park in Milwaukie, Oregon, United States.

See also
 Kellogg Creek Bridge

References

External links

 Kronberg Park, City of Milwaukie

Milwaukie, Oregon
Parks in Clackamas County, Oregon